Clive Bowen (born 1943 in Cardiff) is a Devon based potter whose work is included in a number of public collections.

Education and training 
Bowen studied painting and etching at Cardiff College of Art from 1960-64. He then became the 
apprentice of Michael Leach, at Yelland Pottery where he came to love the rich Fremington clay 
and earthenware of Fishley. A further year at Brannam Pottery in Barnstaple allowed him to 
develop his throwing skills and to gain the ability to make large pots. Residing in North Devon
allowed Bowen the opportunity to help fire pots at Wenford Bridge with Michael Cardew and to
meet Svend Bayer who became a lifelong friend.

Career 
In 1971 Bowen purchased a small agricultural property at Shebbear in North Devon and established his pottery with large double-chambered woodfiring kilns. Bowen still uses local Fremington clay and is internationally known and respected for his
powerful yet intimate pieces. Bowen exhibits widely in the UK throughout Europe, North America and Japan.

Style 
He has been described "as a gestural decorator, even something of an 
action painter, applying a fluid spontaneity and broad hand to his trailing, pouring and combing. 
Seeing his pots in groups - runs of splendid jugs, bowls, platters and press-moulded dishes - 
reveals Bowen's ability to explore within the parameters of his signature forms." (David Whiting)

Public collections 
Bowens work can is included in a number of public collection in the UK including:

 Victoria and Albert Museum
 National Museum of Wales
 Ulster Museum
 Fitzwilliam Museum, Cambridge
 York Art Gallery
 Aberystwyth University Gallery
 Craft Council Collection
 Royal Albert Memorial Museum

Personal life 
Bowen was married to Alison Leach, daughter of Michael Leach and granddaughter of Bernard Leach. Alison unfortunately passed away and Clive married Rosie Bowen. His children, Dylan Bowen and Helena Bowen, are also potters.

References

Further reading 
 The ceramics Book, The craft Potters Association directory.2nd Ed, 2008 
 Davies, Peter, 5 Devon Potters, 2004  p. 43
 DeWal Edmund "Design Sourcebook Ceramics" New Holland  p. 116
 Crafts magazine, Sources of Inspiration - Clive Bowen,  p. 47
 Whiting, David, Modern British Potters, 2009, A.C.Black, London .p. 19

External links 

 Clive Bowen's website

1943 births
Living people
British potters
Alumni of Cardiff School of Art and Design
Artists from Cardiff